Menestomorpha is a moth genus of the family Depressariidae.

Species
 Menestomorpha kimballi (Duckworth, 1964)
 Menestomorpha oblongata Walsingham, 1907

References

Stenomatinae